The 2021–22 UMass Lowell River Hawks Men's ice hockey season was the 55th season of play for the program, the 39th season competing at the Division I level, and the 38th season in the Hockey East conference. The River Hawks represented the University of Massachusetts Lowell and were coached by Norm Bazin, in his 11th season.

Season
Lowell got off to a great start to their season, going nine consecutive games without a loss that included four wins against ranked teams. The primary reason for the early success was from the River Hawks' defense, particularly the stellar goaltending from Owen Savory. By the end of November, Savory was among the national leaders with 1.10 goals against average and 3 shutouts through just 9 games. The hot start earned Lowell its way into the national rankings and put them on the bubble of a potential NCAA bid.

The River Hawks had their first losing weekend of the season in early December, however, because it came against the defending national champions, they weren't harmed by the results too badly. The team responded by winning each of their next five games despite taking over a month to complete that stretch. Their lofty win total put UMass Lowell into the top 10 in late January and had them on the cusp of being a shoe-in for the national tournament. Unfortunately, the River Hawks' lack of offense began to catch up with them in the second half of the season.

Over a period of about a month, from late-January to late-February, Lowell went 4–6. The team could manage more than 3 goals in just one of those games and that came against Dartmouth, one of the worst teams in the nation. The defense performed well but not nearly as stout as they had in the first half of the year. The only saving grace for the Hawks was that most of the losses were to ranked teams and did not send them plummeting down the PairWise rankings. Lowell recovered at the end of the regular season, sweeping their weekend finale and lifting themselves back into the #15 spot where they at least had a chance to make a tournament bid.

Postseason
For finishing 2nd (tied) in the conference standings, Lowell received a bye into the quarterfinals and were set against a fairly surprising Merrimack squad. The Hawks ended up producing their best offensive effort of the season and trounced the Warriors 7–2. The win pushed the team two spots higher in the rankings and gave them a more comfortable position for a tournament bid. In the semifinal round, Lowell faced off against Massachusetts. A win would not only send them to the conference championship but would likely guarantee the Hawks a tournament bid. The defense was again a strength, limiting the Minutemen to just 19 shots, but Lowell could not get on track offensively and ended up losing 1–3. Fortunately, because several underdog teams lost in the semifinal round, Lowel's position as the #13 team was assured an appearance in the NCAA tournament.

The River Hawks played in their first tournament in five years and opened against Denver, the #3 overall seed. Lucas Condotta got the Hawks on the board first and the team seemed to carry the balance of play, though they couldn't stop the Pioneers from tying the game near the end of the period. Lowell managed to kill of three separate penalties in the middle frame, a solid achievement against one of the strongest power plays in the nation. All that work, however, kept the Hawks on the defensive and Denver pressed Savory hard. Mid-way through the third, they finally got their first lead of the game on a shot from Carter Savoie. The River Hawks didn't surrender and immediately set about tying the game once more. In less than five minutes, Connor Sodergren netted the River Hawks' second goal and gave hope that Lowell could pull off the upset in front of the partisan crowd. With just under three minutes to play, Cameron Wright deflected a puck out of mid-air through Savory and took all the momentum away from the Hawks. In spite of a furious charge to get a third goal, Lowell ran out of time and their season came to a close.

Departures

Recruiting

Roster
As of August 12, 2021.

|}

Standings

Schedule and results

|-
!colspan=12 style=";" | Regular season

|-
!colspan=12 style=";" | 

|-
!colspan=12 style=";" |

Scoring statistics

Goaltending statistics

Rankings

Note: USCHO did not release a poll in week 24.

Awards and honors

References

2021-22
UMass Lowell
UMass Lowell
UMass Lowell
UMass Lowell